Aniela Katarzyna Nikiel-Głogosz (born 1 November 1965) is a Polish long-distance runner. She competed in the women's marathon at the 1996 Summer Olympics.

References

1965 births
Living people
Athletes (track and field) at the 1996 Summer Olympics
Polish female long-distance runners
Polish female marathon runners
Olympic athletes of Poland
Sportspeople from Bielsko-Biała